The Avalon Hotel is a hotel at Kungsportsplatsen in Gothenburg, Sweden. It was nominated for the Kasper Salin Prize in 2007. It is part of Design Hotels AG.

History
The site of the hotel at the east end of the Idogheten neighbourhood was built with a four-story stone building in 1879. It features small business locals at ground level and apartments in the above floors. The building was damaged by fire in 1966. Afterward the building was demolished and replaced by a simple one-story barrack with a shoe shop and a saluhall. The property was acquired by Bygg Göta Göteborg AB in 1978, followed by ongoing discussions regarding constructing a new building since the mid-1980s.

Work with a detail plan started in the autumn of 2001 and was finished when the plan was accepted in 2005. The plan specified the form of the new building and that it should, in a harmonic way, fit in the environment but at the same time be representative for its time. The construction permit for the building was approved on 10 January 2006.

Structure and facilities
The hotel has 101 rooms divided in six different categories; Penthouse suite (1), Suite (2), Deluxe (14+8), Superior (30), Business (40), and Moderate (6). Twenty-four of the rooms have miniature spas and three of the rooms have a miniature gym.

External links
Avalonhotel.se — Official website
Expedia.se — Information

Buildings and structures in Gothenburg
Hotels in Sweden
2007 establishments in Sweden
Hotels established in 2007